Amygdali may refer to the following places in Greece:
Amygdali, Karditsa, a town in the Karditsa regional unit
Ano Amygdali, a village in the Larissa regional unit

See also
Amygdalea (disambiguation)